"Descontrol" (English: Out Of Control) is the second single from Daddy Yankee's album Mundial (2010). The single was released to radio on January 12, 2010 and digitally on February 23, 2010. The song is considered as the most successful single from the album, topping on the Latin Rhythm Songs and charting at number 16 on the Hot Latin Songs.

Music video

Promotional video
The same day of the song's premiere, Daddy Yankee released the song on his internet page with a video. It is not the official music video, but it is a video released with the song for the time being.

Official video
The music video was filmed when Yankee went to New York City for three days, taking advantage to make the video for the song. A preview of the video was released on April 21, 2010. The music video was then released on May 17, 2010 in 3-D on his official website.

Charts

Weekly charts

Year-end charts

References

2010 singles
Daddy Yankee songs
Songs written by Daddy Yankee
2010 songs